Blood for a Silver Dollar is a 1965 Spaghetti Western film directed by Giorgio Ferroni, written by Giorgio Stegani and Ferroni, and starring Giuliano Gemma and Ida Galli.

Plot synopsis
Gary O'Hara, a Confederate Lieutenant, returns from the war, to fight one at home. Prior to his release from the Prisoner of War camp his pistol has its barrel sawn off, as well as his brother Phil's gun and all the pistols from Lieutenants of the South. He arrives at his house and finds his wife living in poverty. He promises to reunite with her after three months and travels to Yellowstone to make a living. There, he meets the wealthy landowner and banker McCoy, who hires Gary and asks him to arrest a new gangster in town named "Black Jack", who has supposedly wrought havoc in the community.

Gary agrees to kill Black Jack, but it is revealed too late that the outlaw is actually his brother Phil, who also recognizes his brother Gary just a second later after shooting him. McCoy and his men kill Phil and order a mexican farmer and his wife to bury him and Gary. Soon after, the Mexicans discover that Gary has miraculously survived being shot, since the bullet was stopped by a silver dollar coin Gary always carries in his left pocket. The Mexican couple takes Gary away to safety, and everyone in Yellowstone believes he has died.

After hiding away for some time, Gary returns to the lands near Yellowstone and saves a group of farmers who are being harassed into selling their lands to McCoy. Thus he finds out that his brother Phil was actually protecting and helping the defenseless farmers against McCoy's men's raids and violence. Gary sets himself up for revenge against his former employer, and works with the local sheriff and the farmers' leader to stop McCoy's men from stealing a shipment of gold belonging to the farmers to be used by them to pay off a loan to the bank owned by McCoy. Nevertheless, events take a turn when Gary realizes that the sheriff, as well as McCoy, are in fact former criminals wanted by the law and are only masquerading as respectable men. Things get even more complicated when O'Hara's wife comes into town looking for her husband.

Cast

 Giuliano Gemma (as Montgomery Wood) - Gary O'Hara
 Evelyn Stewart - Judy O'Hara
 Pierre Cressoy (as Peter Cross) - McCory/Max Cory/McCoy/Aloysius MacKenzie
 Giuseppe Addobbati ...  Donaldson (as John Mac Douglas)
 Franco Fantasia ...  Sheriff Anderson (as Frank Farrel)
 Tullio Altamura (as Tor Altmayer) - Peter
 Massimo Righi (as Max Dean) - Brad
 Francisco Fantasia (as Frank Farrel) - Sheriff George Anderson
 Andrea Scotti (as Andrew Scott) - Slim
 Nazzareno Zamperla (as Nicholas Saint John) - Phil O'Hara/Black Jack/Black Eye
 Giuseppe Addobbati (as John MacDouglas) - Donaldson

Release
Blood for a Silver Dollar was first released in 1965. Upon release in the United States, nearly all of the cast members and production team had their names changed for the English audience.

Reception
It was the second highest-grossing Italian film in Italy for the year, behind For A Few Dollars More, with a gross of $2,225,000.

See also
 List of Italian films of 1965

References

Sources

External links 
 
 Opening title sequence at YouTube

1965 films
Italian Western (genre) films
French Western (genre) films
Spaghetti Western films
1965 Western (genre) films
Films directed by Giorgio Ferroni
Films set in the 1860s
American Civil War films
Films scored by Gianni Ferrio
1960s American films
1960s Italian films
1960s French films